Rosa 'Bonica 82,  (aka MEIdomonac), is a shrub rose cultivar, bred by Marie-Louise Meilland in France in 1982. The cultivar  was named an All-America Rose Selections winner in 1987.

Description
'Bonica 82' is a medium bushy shrub, 3 to 5 ft (90—150 cm) in height with a 4—6 ft (121—182 cm) spread. Blooms have an average diameter of 2—3 in (5—7.5 cm) with a petal count of 26 to 40. The plant is excellent for use in the garden, in containers, cut flower, hedge or landscape. 
 
Buds are a rich, dark pink color. Flowers are bright, pale pink when they first open, and later fade to near white in warmer climates. Flowers come in clusters of five to fifteen, and have a mild, sweet fragrance, with ruffled, slightly cupped petals. Flowers have a long bloom time, often producing flowers into late October. The plant produces bright red rose hips that last until the following spring. The leaves are an attractive, semi-glossy,  dark green. The plant is very disease resistant and a repeat bloomer. It thrives in USDA zone 4b through 9b.

Child plants
 Rosa 'Abrud'
 Rosa 'Carte Blanche' 
 Rosa 'Ines Sastre' 
 Rosa 'Magic Meidiland' 
 Rosa 'Mathilda' 
 Rosa 'Mon Jardin et Ma Maison' 
 Rosa  'Pirouette' 
 Rosa 'Red Leonardo da Vinci' 
 Rosa 'Rockin' Robin' 
 Rosa  'Royal Bonica'
 Rosa  'Tequila'
 Rosa  'The Charlatan'

Awards 
 ADR rose winner, (1983)
 All-America Rose Selections winner, USA, (1987)

See also
Garden roses
Rose Hall of Fame
List of Award of Garden Merit roses

Notes

References

Bonica 82